Johannes or Johann Wolf may refer to:
Johannes Wolf (theologian) (1521–1572), Swiss Reformed theologian
Johannes Wolf (musicologist) (1869–1947), German musicologist
Johann Wolf (naturalist) (1765–1824), German naturalist
Johann Christoph Wolf (1683–1739), German Christian Hebraist and polyhistor

See also
Johann Wolff (1537–1600), German jurist 
Rudolf Wolf (born Johann Rudolf Wolf, 1816–1893), Swiss astronomer and mathematician 
John de Wolf (born Johannes Hildebrand de Wolf, born 1962), Dutch former professional footballer
Markus Wolf (born Markus Johannes Wolf, 1923–2006), East German intelligence officer